Microtubule-associated serine/threonine-protein kinase 1 is an enzyme that in humans is encoded by the MAST1 gene.

References

Further reading

EC 2.7.11